Henry W. Green, Jr. (born January 15, 1949) is a judge of the Kansas Court of Appeals.  He has judged on this court since 1993.

Biography
Green was born in Leavenworth, Kansas.  He graduated from Kansas State University with majors in History and Political Science in 1972.  He received his Juris Doctor in 1975 from the University of Kansas Law School.  He is now married and has two children.

Legal career
Green ran a general law practice from 1975 to 1993.  He also worked as a part-time instructor at the National College of Business in Shawnee Mission, Kansas.  In 1979, he became a member of the United States Panel of Bankruptcy Trustees for the District of Kansas, a position he held until his appointment to the court. In 1993, he was appointed by Governor Joan Finney to be a judge on the Kansas Court of Appeals.

References

External links
 Kansas Court of Appeals website 

1949 births
Living people
20th-century American lawyers
20th-century American judges
21st-century American judges
African-American judges
People from Leavenworth, Kansas
Kansas Court of Appeals Judges
Kansas State University alumni
University of Kansas alumni
20th-century African-American people
21st-century African-American people